Gustavo Rodríguez may refer to:

 Gustavo Rodríguez (actor) (1947–2014), Venezuelan actor
 Gustavo Rodríguez (writer) (born 1968), Peruvian writer
 Gustavo Rodríguez Iglesias (born 1979), Spanish cyclist
 Gus Rodríguez (1960–2020), Mexican gamer and video game journalist
 Gustavo Adolfo Rodríguez (born 1998), Mexican footballer